The Carbon Principles are a series of guidelines established by three leading Wall Street banks—Citigroup Inc., JP Morgan Chase, and Morgan Stanley—to assess the risks in financing electric power projects in terms of climate change. These principles call for "enhanced diligence" in evaluating electric power industry borrowers in terms of their use of energy efficiency; renewable and low-carbon distributed energy technologies; and conventional and advanced generating technologies. These guidelines were announced in February 2008 to address the increasing public concern over the plans to create over one hundred coal power plants in the United States.

The Climate Principles are of a similar framework for the climate change practice of the financial sector. This is a comprehensive industry framework for a response to climate change and has been adopted by Crédit Agricole, Munich Re, Standard Chartered, Swiss Re and HSBC.
The Carbon Principles are a development of consultation with the U.S. electricity utilities sector.

References 

 http://www.eere.energy.gov/news/enn.cfm#energy
https://www.banktrack.org/download/the_principle_matter_banks_climate_and_the_carbon_principles/ran_the_principle_matter_carbonprinciplereport.pdf

External links 
 https://web.archive.org/web/20081208200229/http://www.theclimategroup.org/about/corporate_leadership/climate_principles

Climate change assessment and attribution
Climate change in the United States
Electricity economics